Robert Brisco (1928–2004) was a Canadian politician.

Robert or Bob Briscoe may also refer to:

 Robert P. Briscoe (1897–1968), United States Admiral
 Robert Briscoe (politician) (1894–1969), Irish politician
 Bob "Bulldog" Briscoe, character in Frasier
 Sir Robert Brisco, Baronet of the Brisco baronets

See also
 Robert Brisco Earée (1846–1928), English priest and philatelist
 Brisco (disambiguation)